Pedro de Toledo Osorio y Colonna or Pedro Álvarez de Toledo Osorio, 5th Marquess of Villafranca del Bierzo, (Naples, 6 September 1546 – 17 July 1627), Governor of the Duchy of Milan, 1616–1618, Prince of Montalbano, 2nd Duke of Fernandina was a Spanish-Italian nobleman and a Grandee of Spain.

Biography
He was the son of García de Toledo Osorio, 4th Marquess of Villafranca, and Vittoria Colonna di Paliano. His mother was the niece of Vittoria Colonna.

He was Commander in chief of an army in Naples, General of Cavalry of Spain in 1621. His success in Milan was awarded with the honorable Grandeza de España title in 1623. In 1625 he participated in the successful Defense of Cadiz against the attacks from the Anglo-Dutch fleet under the command of Sir Edward Cecil.

The expulsion of the Spanish moriscos since 1610 increased the Ottoman naval attacks in the West Mediterranean, especially when young Ahmed I became Sultan. Pedro Alvarez set up an extensive defensive engineering program, with Italian engineers working in Italy, Spain and the Caribbean in America.

On 7 June 1576 he married  Elvira de Mendoza, daughter of Íñigo Lopez de Hurtado de Mendoza, III Marquess of Mondéjar, 4th count of Tendilla,  Viceroy of Naples, 1575–1579, a.k.a. Iñigo López de Mendoza y Mendoza (1512–1580), and Maria de Mendoza.

They had four children.
 Doña Victoria de Toledo, married Don Luis Ponce de León, 6th Marquess of Zahara
 Don García de Toledo Osorio, 6th Marquess of Villafranca, deceased at Madrid, 1649 and Grandee of Spain, notorious admiral fighting against the French and Moroccans.
 Don Fadrique de Toledo, 1st Marquess of Villanueva de Valdueza
 Doña María de Toledo, a nun

1546 births
1627 deaths
Pedro
102
17th-century Italian nobility
Marquesses of Spain
Spanish diplomats
Spanish generals
Spanish politicians
Grandees of Spain